Sakhavinte Priyasakhi  is a 2018 Indian Malayalam-language political thriller film written and directed by Sidheeque Thamarasseri. Starring Sudheer Karamana, Neha Saxena, Amit Jolly, Salim Kumar, Kalabhavan Shajohn, and Shine Tom Chacko. The film was released in India on 5 January 2018.

Synopsis

Rohini is the widow of a Communist leader in Kannur. Rohini's husband is killed in a political fight, soon after their marriage. The movie narrates the life of Rohini after the death of her husband.

Cast

 Neha Saxena as Rohini
 Sudheer Karamana as Sakhavu Shiva Prasad
 Shine Tom Chacko
 Salim Kumar
 Kalabhavan Shajohn
 Amith Jolly
 Megha Mathew
 Indrans
 Anoop Chandran
 Ardra Nair
 Hareesh Kanaran 
 kolapully Leela 
 Kochu Preman 
 Jolly Bastin

Production
It is the first independent production by Arshad P. P. kodiyil under the banner of Janapriya cinemas. On 29 January 2017, a pooja function was held at Ottapalam. Indian politician Paloli Mohammed Kutty done the first clap of the film. The principal photography commenced along with the pooja ceremony. The movie, directed by Sidheeque Thamarasseri, has a female-centric script based on the politics in Kannur. Neha Saxena plays Rohini, opposite Sudheer Karamana's Sakhavu Shivaprasad. She is a woman who struggles to live after her husband's demise." The filming was wrapped in May 2017.

Music
The film contains songs composed by Harikumar Hareram. The lyrics were written by Rafeeq Ahamed and Alankode Leelakrishnan.

References

External links 
 

2018 films
Indian political thriller films
Films about communism
Films shot in Ottapalam
Films shot in Kannur
2010s Malayalam-language films